San Juanico Airstrip  is a public dirt airstrip located in San Juanico, Municipality of Comondú, Baja California Sur, Mexico, a town located on the Pacific Ocean coast, which is a famous surfing area better known as "Scorpion Bay". The airstrip is used solely for general aviation purposes, but now is closed, so the Cadejé Airstrip is used as an alternative.

External links
Baja Bush Pilots forum about San Juanico Airstrip

Defunct airports in Baja California
Comondú Municipality